Chandanapally may refer to places in India: 

Chandanapally, Kerala, a village in Kerala state
Chandanapally, Andhra Pradesh